Baker Barracks is a British Army barracks located on Thorney Island around  east from Portsmouth, Hampshire.

History
The barracks were established, on the site of the former RAF Thorney Island airbase, in 1986, when 26th Regiment Royal Artillery moved on site. Named after Field Marshal Sir Geoffrey Baker, a former Royal Artillery officer, they have been home to 47th Regiment Royal Artillery, armed with the Starstreak missile, since 1989. In January 2008, 12th Regiment Royal Artillery moved to the island upon their return from Germany.
In 2009, the airfield was used as a test track for a British-built steam car hoping to smash the longest standing land speed record. The British Steam Car Challenge team included test driver Don Wales, nephew of the late Donald Campbell and grandson of Sir Malcolm Campbell.

Based units 
The following units are based at Baker Barracks.

Ministry of Defence
 Centre of Specialisation for Joint Ground Based Air Defence Units (JTGBAD)
British Army
Headquarters, 7th Air Defence Group, at Centaur House
12th Regiment Royal Artillery (Self-Propelled Air Defence, armed with Alvis Stormer air defence system)
16th Regiment Royal Artillery (Mobile Air Defence, armed with Sky Sabre air defence missile systems)
Royal School of Artillery
Ground Based Air Defence Wing — responsible for all training for air defence systems

Role and operations 
Baker Barracks is home to two Royal Artillery regiments operating in the ground based air-defence role, operating the Thales Starstreak and MBDA Rapier surface-to-air missile systems.

Footnotes

References 

 

Installations of the British Army
Barracks in England